Luciano Guerzoni may refer to:

Luciano Guerzoni (born 1935), Italian politician, Member of the Senate in the XI, XII, XIII, and XIV Legislatures
Luciano Guerzoni (born 1938), Italian politician, Member of the Chamber of Deputies in the IX, X, and XII Legislatures